The carbonite ion is the double ionized ion of dihydroxymethylidene, with the chemical formula:  .

Carbonite was not detected when sodium was used as the metal. The alkali metal carbonites obtained in the cryogenic experiments decomposed to the corresponding carbonate (with release of carbon monoxide) or oxalate. The carbonite ion is promptly converted to carbonate in the presence of oxygen.

The presence of carbonite ions has been proposed to be relevant to the absorption of carbon monoxide on calcium oxide and magnesium oxide and on ceria.  In the former, it has been suggested that the carbon atom attaches via a coordinate covalent bond to an oxygen atom from the substrate through its free bonds. In these contexts, it appears  that the carbonite ion reacts with excess carbon monoxide to form an anion with the ketene structure, O=C=.

Infrared spectroscopy data confirm earlier theoretical studies that the carbonite anion has a bent structure, with the O−C−O angle varying between 120° and 130° depending on the context. The metal atoms interact with both oxygen atoms. However two geometrical arrangements for the lithium and caesium salts were detected, only one of them being symmetrical on the two oxygen atoms.

References 

Oxyanions